Uladzimir Zhylka (27 May 1900, in Makaszy near Nesvizh, Russian Empire – 1 March 1933), was a Belarusian poet.

He was an author of symbolistic love lyrical poetry and patriotic-independence related poems (Na rostani). He translated works of Adam Mickiewicz, Henrik Ibsen, and Charles Baudelaire.

In 1926, he emigrated to East Belarus, where he was arrested by the NKVD in 1930 as part of the Case of the Union of Liberation of Belarus and sentenced for 5 years to concentration camps in the Vyatka region. He died in 1933.

References

Further reading

 

1900 births
1933 deaths
People from Nesvizh District
People from Novogrudsky Uyezd
Belarusian male poets
Belarusian translators
20th-century translators
20th-century Belarusian poets
20th-century male writers